Five ships of the Royal Navy have borne the name HMS Carysfort:
  was a 28-gun sixth rate launched in 1766 and sold in 1813
  was a 26-gun sixth rate launched in 1836 and sold in 1861
  was a  screw corvette launched in 1878 and sold in 1899
  was a  light cruiser launched in 1914 and scrapped in 1931
  was a  destroyer launched in 1944 and sold in 1970

Royal Navy ship names